Peewee Ferris is a DJ from Sydney. Ferris began mixing at an early age, being inspired by his older brothers Stephen and John who are also DJs.

Ferris has headlined numerous events including the Big Day Out and Ministry of Sound and the Australian tours of The Prodigy, Chemical Brothers, Primal Scream, and Cream Tour, Godskitchen, Stereosonic, Future Music Festival, and many more. He has ranked highly in various dance magazine polls, gaining worldwide exposure and thus gaining work through Asia, Europe and Africa.

Ferris' album Social Narcotic gained him two ARIA Award nominations, with the single "I Feel It" certified Gold by ARIA. He has remixed for many artists including Human Nature and Men at Work and composed for the opening and closing ceremonies of the Sydney 2000 Olympic Games and the Doha 2006 Asian Games and Shanghai World Expo 2010 . Ferris also composes the soundtracks for Sydney New Year's Eve Fireworks.

In 2004 Ferris became the exclusive ambassador for the Italian clothing company Kappa and in 2009 became official ambassador for the Sydney FC and Ableton Live 8 .

History 
One of Australia's most influential DJs and producers, Peewee Ferris has been instrumental in the Australian and international dance movement for well over fifteen years. He has headlined many major Australian dance events, including the Big Day Out (1996, 1997, 2000, 2004, and 2009), Future Music Festival, Ministry of Sound Australia, Summadayze and Australian tours of The Prodigy, Chemical Brothers and Cream.

Whether DJing in the remote town of Kalumburu or at his monthly residency in Melbourne, Peewee is still the Resident DJ at the club Sublime at Home Nightclub Sydney. Sublime celebrated its 12th birthday in 2008 with a classic club anthem CD called Sublime XII, programmed and mixed by Peewee. He also has a Saturday night residency at the Kings Cross Hotel.

Peewee was voted one of the Top 40 DJs in the 2004 and 2005 by Australian website Inthemix, one of the top 25 most influencing people in the Australian dance scene by Ministry of Sound Australia magazine, voted one of the top DJs in the world by German Juice magazine and one of the top 100 DJs in the world by British DJ Magazine.

This international exposure has led Peewee to work throughout Asia, Europe and even Africa. Peewee has toured China twice, alongside Seb Fontaine and Yousef and has made guest appearances at the legendary Zouk in Singapore. Further, Peewee was the first Australian DJ to play in South Africa at Freedom Festival during 2001. Peewee also graced the shores of Hannover, Germany, where he was invited to play at Lovestern Galatika Meets EXPO 2000, with an international line-up and more than 15,000 party people.

Peewee has twice been nominated for an ARIA award for his album Social Narcotic and his Top 20 single "I feel It" and has been awarded an ARIA Gold Record for production work. Peewee has knotched up over 70 different dance remixes for Australian and international artists such as Ultrasonic, Jocelyn Brown and Eternal Rhythm. Peewee's pseudonyms include Evac, Slot Jockies, and Pipi Le Oui. Peewee was the first DJ to release a DJ mixed DVD compilation featuring 74 minutes of VJ (video jockey) visuals.

Music production is an imminent part of Peewee Ferris' career. The role of the DJ has become more than just a jukebox but a producer, remixer and songwriter. By far the most prestigious highlight of Peewee's career was composing original music for the opening and closing ceremonies for the Sydney 2000 Olympic Games, reaching an audience of over 4 billion people worldwide.

Peewee was the musical composer and arranger for the Sydney Gay Games opening ceremony. His diverse musical production repertoire extends from corporate television and radio advertising campaigns to film soundtracks all around the world.

Peewee has recently released 'Sublime XII', 'Peaktime Vol 4' and 'Wildweekends Vol 3' double CD's for Central Station Records and composing and remixing music for the Opening Ceremony of the Asian Games in Doha, Qatar. He is currently the soundtrack composer for Sydney New Year's Eve and is also touring in Indonesia playing at Ocean Beach Club in Kuta and Club Sykgarden.

In 2009 Peewee played to his biggest audience ever at the Big Day Out Tour. Over 40,000 people packed inside the Boiler room to see Peewee perform before The Prodigy who ended the festival. Peewee has hit the record books with highest number of national tours on the Big Day Out Festival-Six plus many more side shows.

Discography 
 T20 World Cup Opening Ceremony 2020 Opening Ceremony
 Vivid Live 2019 - original soundtrack -Robot Spaceland Installation
 Shanghai World Expo 2010 Opening Ceremony
 Sydney 2000 Olympic Games – Opening and closing ceremonies.
 Arranged the soundtracks for Sydney New Year's Eve (2000, 2001, 2006, 2007, 2008, 2009).
 Music for the Sydney 2002 Gay Games – Opening and closing ceremonies.
 Arranged soundtrack(s) for the Doha 2006 Asian Games.

Charting singles

Awards and nominations

ARIA Awards
The ARIA Music Awards is an annual awards ceremony that recognises excellence, innovation, and achievement across all genres of Australian music..

|-
| 1996 || "I Feel It" || ARIA Award for Best Dance Release || 
|-

References

External links 
 

Year of birth missing (living people)
Living people
Musicians from Sydney
Australian DJs
Australian musicians
People educated at St Aloysius' College (Sydney)